Renzo Fontona (born 2 July 1939) is an Italian racing cyclist. He ended up 7th at the 1963 Tour de France.

External links

1939 births
Living people
Italian male cyclists
Sportspeople from the Province of La Spezia
Cyclists from Liguria